HMS Moresby was a  which served with the Royal Navy during the First World War. The M class were an improvement on the previous , capable of higher speed. Originally laid down as HMS Marlion by J. Samuel White at East Cowes on the Isle of Wight, the vessel was renamed before being launched on 20 November 1915. At the Battle of Jutland, the destroyer was initially cover for the seaplane tender  but soon joined the action as part of a flotilla led by the light cruiser . Moresby attacked the German fleet with torpedoes, initially unsuccessfully targeting the dreadnought battleship  and, near the end of the battle, unleashing another which narrowly missed the battlecruiser . In March 1918, the destroyer sank  with the destroyer . After the war, the destroyer was placed in reserve and eventually sold to be broken up on 9 May 1921.

Design and development
Moresby was one of sixteen s ordered by the British Admiralty in September 1914 as part of the First War Construction Programme. The M-class was an improved version of the earlier  destroyers, required to reach a higher speed in order to counter rumoured German fast destroyers. It transpired that the German ships did not exist.

Displacement was  normal and  full load. Three funnels were fitted.

Armament consisted of three single QF  Mk IV guns on the ship's centreline, with one on the forecastle, one aft on a raised platform and one between the middle and aft funnels. Torpedo armament consisted of two twin mounts for  torpedoes. A single QF 2-pounder  "pom-pom" anti-aircraft gun was mounted between the torpedo tubes. After February 1916, for anti-submarine warfare, Moresby was equipped with two chutes for two depth charges. The number of depth charges carried increased as the war progressed. The ship had a complement of 80 officers and ratings.

Construction and career
Marlion was laid down by J. Samuel White at East Cowes on the Isle of Wight on 1 January 1915 with the yard number 1456, and launched on 20 November. The ship was completed on 7 April 1916 and joined the Grand Fleet. By this time, the ship's name had already been changed to Moresby. to honour Admiral Fairfax Moresby. The vessel was deployed as part of the Grand Fleet, joining the Thirteenth Destroyer Flotilla.

On 30 May 1916, the destroyer sailed with the Grand Fleet to confront the German High Seas Fleet in the Battle of Jutland. Moresby was one of fourteen M-class destroyers that were allocated to form part of the screen to protect the battlecruisers of the fleet. However, along with sistership , the destroyer was detached to cover the seaplane tender . The tender had launched a Short Type 184 to observe the German fleet movements and was stationary waiting for it to return. After the reconnaissance seaplane had been recovered, Lieutenant commander Jack Tovey, who commanded Onslow, led the two destroyers back into the action.

Moresby rejoined the flotilla and, led by the light cruiser , steamed towards the German High Seas Fleet. The two fleets met and Moresby was soon in the centre of the action. The destroyer attacked the German battlecruisers, and shortly after 17:10 on 31 May, launched a torpedo at the dreadnought battleship . The destroyer also narrowly escaped an attack from the light cruiser , two torpedoes streaking past, one ahead and the other astern. As the battlesfleets broke apart, Champion sped away in pursuit of the German fleet, leaving the majority of the destroyers behind, with only Moresby and  able to keep up.

The small flotilla sought for the main German fleet, and at 02:15 the following day turned westwards towards gunfire. They saw four German cruisers with their attendant destroyers. However, through the mist, Moresby saw what were initially taken to be four pre-dreadnought battleships. The destroyer reported a hit and then withdrew. In fact, two of the vessels were German battlecruisers, and the torpedo narrowly missed . Instead, the torpedo hit the torpedo boat .

The destroyer was transferred to Buncrana, Ireland, with the Second Destroyer Flotilla during the latter part of 1917. The vessel served as a convoy escort, and on 2 October 1917, was also involved in the ultimately unsuccessful efforts to save the armoured cruiser . On 15 March the following year, the destroyer was patrolling with sistership  when they surprised  shortly after the submarine had sunk the ocean liner . The submarine dived but was brought back to the surface when the destroyers attacked with depth charges and was finished by gunfire. Six of the crew were rescued.

AAfter the Armistice of 11 November 1918 that ended the war, the Royal Navy returned to a peacetime level of strength and both the number of ships and the amount of personnel needed to be reduced to save money. Moresby was taken out of active service and initially placed alongside fifty-two other destroyers in reserve at Nore. On 9 May 1921, the vessel was sold to Thos. W. Ward of Grays and was broken up in 1923.

Pennant numbers

References

Citations

Bibliography

 
 
  
 
 
 
 
 
 
 
 
 
 
 
 
 
 
 
 
 

1915 ships
Admiralty M-class destroyers
Ships built on the Isle of Wight
World War I destroyers of the United Kingdom